ITS Platform is a Danish project which will develop and test the next generation of technologies in the field of ITS equipment in the years from 2010 to 2013. ITS is the abbreviation for “intelligent transport systems”, and it covers systems and services which can contribute to make the traffic of the future safer, more efficient, and more sustainable.

Concept
ITS Platform consists of a mobile unit in a car and an ITS server. The mobile unit, called the InnBox, collects information about things like the driver's position, speed, and acceleration. The collected information is sent to the server, where it will be retained and re-sent to the drivers, who thus receives targeted and individual traffic information both during and after their driving.

Applications
It is strongly emphasised that the system functions as an open platform and as the basis on which the actual ITS applications and services are built. The ITS Platform will develop four demonstration applications, which will be fully operational and may serve as inspiration for an actual product development by other interested companies. The system will contribute to relieve the traffic problems in and around the bigger cities. The four demonstration applications will consist of:
 Driving-statistics application – to collect data about driving style, and the driver is able to print a log which fulfills the demands of the Danish Tax Authority
 Personally adapted traffic information about congestion on and near the driver's route
 Parking application – automatically pays driver's parking ticket
 Cooperates with the Danish National Road Directorate on optimising the continuous traffic information for the benefit of all drivers

The participants have access to the application through a personal website, and it is possible to get information by text messages.

Industrial development
The project, which is coordinated by Aalborg University in cooperation with the companies GateHouse and Inntrasys, will be a promoter for the development of an ITS cluster anchored in North Jutland of Denmark. Here new technologies are developed and tested before they are implemented throughout the country.
The ITS Platform has a total budget of 35 million DKK (5 million €). The project is funded with DKK 17.4 million from the EU Regional Development Fund, the North Jutland Development Fund, as well as Aalborg University, GateHouse, and Inntrasys.

Cooperation
ITS Platform is based partly on thorough knowledge about mobile communication, databases and tracking by the companies Inntrasys and GateHouse and partly on a long series of results from research by Aalborg University. The InnBox is developed by Inntrasys, and GateHouse works with the ITS server. In addition to this The Municipality of Aalborg, DR (Danish Broadcasting Corporation), the Danish Road Directorate, and Nets participate in the project.

See also
GateHouse
Inntrasys
ITS Denmark (only available in Danish)
ITS Platform

Footnotes

Intelligent transportation systems
Proposed transport infrastructure in Denmark
Science and technology in Denmark